Arsen Bauk (born 7 February 1973) is a Croatian politician who served as a minister at Ministry of Public Administration at the Cabinet of Zoran Milanović from 2011 until 2016. He is member of the center-left Social Democratic Party of Croatia (SDP).

References

 

1973 births
Living people
Faculty of Science, University of Zagreb alumni
Government ministers of Croatia
Social Democratic Party of Croatia politicians
People from Brač
People from Supetar
Representatives in the modern Croatian Parliament